Thomas George (Tommy) Farr (12 March 1913 – 1 March 1986) was a Welsh boxer from Clydach Vale, Rhondda, nicknamed "the Tonypandy Terror". Prior to 1936, Farr boxed in the light heavyweight division, in which he was the Welsh champion. He became British and Empire heavyweight champion on 15 March 1937. He challenged for the world title against Joe Louis in the same year and gave Louis one of the toughest fights of his career, hurting him numerous times and lasting the full 15 rounds on his way to a wide unanimous decision loss, with the referee awarding Louis the fight thirteen rounds to one, while the judges scored the fight eight to five and nine to six, both in Louis's favour. The decision was booed by spectators. Farr is considered to be one of the greatest British heavyweight fighters ever. Farr was inducted into the Welsh Sports Hall of Fame in 1997.

Boxing career

Early career 
In his early career he didn't have much success. He garnered some wins but losses specked his record every two or three wins. Most of his losses were against unknowns. He soon started improving, with a win over top contender Tommy Loughran in 1936. In 1937 he bested ex-champion Max Baer and earned a title shot against Joe Louis.

World title fight vs Joe Louis
On 30 August 1937, Farr fought world heavyweight champion Joe Louis at the height of his career at Yankee Stadium, New York City. He earned respect despite losing a controversial points decision after 15 rounds. Louis had knocked out eight of his previous nine opponents and proceeded to knock out his next seven, but was attacked and hurt by Farr.  The 50,000 crowd booed when Louis won. Referee Arthur Donovan, Sr. had seemingly raised Farr's glove in victory, causing controversy. Seven years later, in his published account of the fight, Donovan apologised for the 'mistake', claiming he had meant to shake Farr's hand to congratulate him for what he saw as an impressive fight. "Mistakes" hardly ended there, however. Donovan's own scorecard, had 13 rounds going to Louis.

Though mixed accounts say Louis deserved the nod, 13 frames out of 15 prompted these words from a British sportswriter: "The verdict is that of a man either blindly partisan or afflicted with astigmatism. It is a verdict that justifies the beliefs that nothing short of the annihilation of Louis would have given Farr victory. That Louis won may not be disputed, but as I read the fight, there was only a fractional difference in his favour at the finish." However, In Donovan's account, he stands by his scoring of the fight, claiming that while Farr's punches may have appeared to have done more damage than Louis's from the crowd's point of view, from his perspective and that of the ringside judges the opposite was true.

Contrary views of the fight's result continued for many years. In The Encyclopedia of Boxing, as compiled by Gilbert Odd in the 1980s, Tommy's listing concludes its thumbnail on the championship bout with "...Louis came back strongly and clinched a narrow points verdict." The actual ferocity of the battle and its level of competition, seldom contested, may be summed up by Tommy Farr, later on in life: "When I talk about that fight, my nose still bleeds."

Later career
After the Louis fight, Farr was unsuccessful in several contests at Madison Square Garden, New York. These included a ten-round fight on 21 January 1938, against former heavyweight champion James J. Braddock, "the Cinderella Man". He also lost to Max Baer the same year, even though he had defeated him before. Farr returned to the UK early in 1939, enjoying a run of victories that year. He retired in 1940, but personal tragedies saw him lose his fortune. He ended up bankrupt, having to return to the ring at the age of 36 to make a living, during this time, he was taken under the wing of businessman Lesie T.Salts, the owner of Gwrych Castle.  Farr later ran a pub in Brighton, Sussex in final retirement, and died on St. David's Day, 1986, aged 72. He is buried at Trealaw Cemetery.

Musical Contender
In 2007, Contender, a musical based on Farr's career, was composed by Mal Pope and premiered at the United Nations building in New York, followed by a season at Swansea's Grand Theatre. A theme of the musical is that Farr's lack of success in the USA resulted wholly from his refusal to co-operate with fight-fixing mobsters and bookmakers.

Notable bouts 

| style="text-align:center;" colspan="7"|
|-  style="text-align:center; background:#e3e3e3;"
|  style="border-style:none none solid solid; "|Result
|  style="border-style:none none solid solid; "|Opponent
|  style="border-style:none none solid solid; "|Type
|  style="border-style:none none solid solid; "|Rd., Time
|  style="border-style:none none solid solid; "|Date
|  style="border-style:none none solid solid; "|Location
|  style="border-style:none none solid solid; "|Notes
|- align=center
|Loss
|align=left| Don Cockell
|
|
|
|align=left|
|align=left|
|- align=center
|Loss
|align=left| Lloyd Marshall
|
|
|
|align=left|
|align=left|
|- align=center
|Win
|align=left| Larry Gains
|
|
|
|align=left|
|align=left|
|- align=center
|Win
|align=left| Red Burman
|
|
|
|align=left|
|align=left|
|- align=center
|Loss
|align=left| Red Burman
|
|
|
|align=left|
|align=left|
|- align=center
|Loss
|align=left| Lou Nova
|
|
|
|align=left|
|align=left|
|- align=center
|Loss
|align=left| Max Baer
|
|
|
|align=left|
|align=left|
|- align=center
|Loss
|align=left| James J. Braddock
|
|
|
|align=left|
|align=left|
|- align=center
|Loss
|align=left| Joe Louis
|
|
|
|align=left|
|align=left|
|- align=center
|Win
|align=left| Walter Neusel
|
|
|
|align=left|
|align=left|
|- align=center
|Win
|align=left| Max Baer
|
|
|
|align=left|
|align=left|
|- align=center
|Win
|align=left| Ben Foord
|
|
|
|align=left|
|align=left|
|- align=center
|Win
|align=left| Bob Olin
|
|
|
|align=left|
|align=left|
|- align=center
|Win
|align=left| Tommy Loughran
|
|
|
|align=left|
|align=left|
|- align=center
|Win
|align=left| Frank Moody
|
|
|
|align=left|
|align=left|
|- align=center
|style="background:#abcdef;"|Draw
|align=left| Frank Moody
|
|
|
|align=left|
|align=left|
|- align=center
|Win
|align=left| Del Fontaine
|
|
|
|align=left|
|align=left|

References

Bibliography
 Lonkhurst, Bob Man of Courage: The Life and Career of Tommy Farr Book Guild 1997, . 250 pp.
 Myler P Ring of Hate: Joe Louis vs. Max Schmeling: The Fight of the Century Arcade Publishing (2005) This source contains a detailed report of Louis's fight with Tommy Farr, at page 113.

External links

 Fight record of Tommy Farr
 The lineage of Thomas George Farr, 1913-1986
 Louis v Farr: round-by-round description. Perth Daily News, 31 August 1937

1913 births
1986 deaths
Welsh male boxers
Heavyweight boxers
People from Clydach Vale
Sportspeople from Rhondda Cynon Taf
People from Tonypandy